The Birmingham Hall Green by-election of 6 May 1965 was held after the appointment to the Prices and Incomes Board of incumbent Conservative MP Aubrey Jones.

The seat was considered safe, having been won at the 1964 United Kingdom general election by over 9,400 votes

Result of the previous general election

Result of the by-election

References

1965 in England
1965 elections in the United Kingdom
By-elections to the Parliament of the United Kingdom in Birmingham, West Midlands constituencies
1960s in Birmingham, West Midlands